Hoyerswerdaer FC is an association football club from Hoyerswerda, Saxony, Germany.

The club was founded on 15 January 1956 in East Germany. Under the name BSG Aktivist Schwarze Pumpe, it reached as high as the DDR-Liga, the second tier in East Germany, where it played in the ultimate (1990–91) season of the DDR-Liga.

Following the reunification of Germany, the club changed its name to FSV Hoyerswerda and later FC Lausitz Hoyerswerda. The club colours were yellow and black. It incorporated the club Hoyerswerdaer SV 1919 in 2016, changing its name to Hoyerswerdaer FC.

References

Further reading
Hanns Leske: Enzyklopädie des DDR-Fußballs. Göttingen: Die Werkstatt, 2007, ISBN 978-3-89533-556-3, pp. 71–72.

Football clubs in Germany
Sport in Saxony
Hoyerswerda
1956 establishments in Germany
Association football clubs established in 1956